Jenny Lynn (c. 1942–2021) was a professional figure competitor.

Jenny Lynn, Jenny Lyn, or Jennylyn may also refer to:

Jenny Lynn (photographer) (born 1953), American photographer
Jenny-Lyn Anderson (born 1992), Australian swimmer
Jennylyn Mercado (born 1987), Filipina actress
Jennylyn Reyes (born 1991), Filipino volleyball player

See also
 Jenny Lind (1820–1887), Swedish opera singer